The Lost Domain is a 2005 French film directed by Chilean filmmaker Raúl Ruiz.

Cast
François Cluzet
Grégoire Colin
Édith Scob
Marianne Denicourt
Christian Colin
Julie Delarme

References

2005 films
Films directed by Raúl Ruiz
French fantasy drama films
2000s French films